Giovanni Battista Grassi (27 March 1854 – 4 May 1925) was an Italian physician and zoologist, best known for his pioneering works on parasitology, especially on malariology. He was Professor of Comparative Zoology at the University of Catania from 1883, and Professor of Comparative Anatomy at Sapienza University of Rome from 1895 until his death. His scientific contributions covered embryological development of honey bees, on helminth parasites, the vine parasite phylloxera, on migrations and metamorphosis in eels, and on termites. He was the first to describe and establish the life cycle of the human malarial parasite, Plasmodium falciparum, and discovered that only female anopheline mosquitoes are capable of transmitting the disease. His works in malaria remain a lasting controversy in the history of Nobel Prizes, because a British army surgeon Ronald Ross, who discovered the transmission of malarial parasite in birds was given the 1902 Nobel Prize in Physiology or Medicine. But Grassi, who demonstrated the complete route of transmission of human Plasmodium, and correctly identified the types of malarial parasite as well as the mosquito vector, Anopheles claviger, was denied.

Grassi was the first to demonstrate the life cycle of human dwarf tapeworm Taenia nana, and that this tapeworm does not require an intermediate host, contrary to popular belief. He was the first to demonstrate the direct life cycle of the roundworm Ascaris lumbricoides by self-experimentation. He described canine filarial worm Dipetalonema reconditum, and demonstrated the parasite life cycle in fleas, Pulex irritans. He invented the genus of threadworms Strongyloides. He named the spider Koenenia mirabilis in 1885 after his wife, Maria Koenen. He pioneered the foundation of pest control for phylloxera of grapes.

Biography 

Grassi was born in Rovellasca, Italy, in what is now the Province of Como. His father Luigi Grassi was a municipal official, and mother Costanza Mazzuchelli was a noted peasant of unusual intelligence. His early education was at Saronno.

From 1872 he studied medicine at the University of Pavia under professors Camillo Golgi and Giulio Bizzozero and graduated in 1878. After graduation he worked first at Messina in the Naples Zoological Station and the Oceanographic Station founded by Nicolaus Kleinenberg and Anton Dohrn where he studied Chaetognatha, then completed his training at the University of Heidelberg in Germany under the guidance of Karl Gegenbaur and Otto Bütschli.  While in Heidelberg, he married Maria Koenen.

In 1883 he became Professor of Comparative Zoology at the University of Catania, studying cestodes, the life cycle of the European eel (Catania) and the Moray eel (Rome). Also in Catania he began to study entomology and wrote a student text "The Origin and Descent of Myriapods and Insects" in addition to scientific papers. He also began to study malaria working with Raimondo Feletti on malaria, especially bird malaria.

In 1895 he was appointed professor of comparative anatomy at Sapienza University of Rome, where he would spend the rest of his life.  He joined Angelo Celli, Amico Bignami, Giuseppe Bastianelli and Ettore Marchiafava, who were working on malaria in districts around Rome. Grassi was the group's entomologist. The group announced at the session of the Accademia dei Lincei on 4 December 1889 that a healthy man in a non-malarial zone had contracted tertian malaria after being bitten by an experimentally infected Anopheles claviger. Between 1900 and 1902, Grassi, Gustavo Pittaluga and Giovanni Noè made intensive studies of malaria at Agro Portuense, at Fiumicino, on the Tiber, and on the plain of Capaccio, near Paestum.

In 1902, Grassi abandoned his study of malaria and began work on the sandfly responsible for Leishmaniasis (Phlebotomus papatasii) and on a serious insect pest of the grape vine (Phylloxera vastatrix ). Endemic malaria returned to Italy during and after the First World War and Grassi resumed his mosquito studies.

He died in Rome in 1925 while reading the proof of his last paper, Lezione sulla malaria.

Following his will, he was interred at a village cemetery in Fiumicino, a commune in the province of Rome, as he achieved his most important medical research there. His wife Maria (1860–1942) and daughter Isabella were also interred at the same tomb.

Professional achievements

Anatomy and entomology 

Grassi's earlier works were on anatomy and then entomology. He studied the development of the vertebral column in bony fishes and also endemic goiter. His studies on bees, myriapods and termites were monumental. He also studied the chetognates and the reproduction of eels, and he described a new species of spider, Koenenia mirabilis in 1885, dedicated to his wife.

He also made significant contribution to the study of the phylloxera of grapes, which he pursued for several years. The notes of his observations La questione fillosserica in Italia (1904) influenced the Italian Ministry of Agriculture, which eventually requested him to do an exhaustive study of this subject. In 1912 he produced a monumental investigation of the morphology and biology of the Italian and other European genera of phylloxera. It was a foundation for systematic control of agricultural pests.

Helminthology 

In 1876 Grassi investigated his native hometown Rovellasca for the high mortality of cats and discovered that they were heavily infected with the nematode Dochmius balsami. In 1878, while still a student at the University of Pavia, he discovered anchylostomiasis in Italy from by identifying the eggs from the faeces of infected individuals. He continued to make great impacts on the study of Anguillula intestinalis, filarial worms, Trichocephalus dispar, and Bilharzia. He was the first to show that the human dwarf tapeworm Taenia nana is able to go through its entire life cycle in one animal, without the need of an intermediate host, a notion that had long been rejected. He was also the first to show that the flea Pulex serraticeps is the intermediate host of feline tapeworm Taenia elliptica. Thus he proposed that swallowing of infected fleas (for example, with milk) might be the reason for taeniasis in children. In 1879 he published a work on the life cycle of Strongyloides stercoralis, and erected the genus Strongyloides. In 1890 he, with Salvatore Calandruccio, described Dipetalonema reconditum, a non-pathogenic filarial worm of dogs, and showed that the parasite completed its development in human fleas, Pulex irritans.

The first crucial step in understanding the life cycle of the roundworm Ascaris lumbricoides was demonstrated by Grassi in a grotesque self-experimentation. To solve a century-old puzzle of how infection of roundworm is transmitted from one host to another, he ingested the roundworm eggs on 30 August 1879. He had obtained the eggs from a human corpse, which was heavily infected, upon autopsy on 10 October 1878. After twenty-two days, he found fresh eggs in his faeces. Thus proving that the roundworm is transmitted through direct ingestion from contaminated source.

Malaria and the life cycle of Plasmodium 

Grassi made his first contribution on malaria in 1890, when he (with Raimondo Feletti) discovered Haemamoeba vivax, later renamed Plasmodium vivax. He described Proteosoma praecox, the malaria parasite of birds. In 1891 he performed the first inoculation of malaria parasites from one bird into another. He was the first to compile a comprehensive monograph on the identity and impact of different malarial parasites. His work Studi di uno Zoologo Sulla Malaria  in 1891 is as relevant today as it was in his time. His description of the specific characteristics responsible for benign tertian (Haemamoeba vivax), malignant tertian (Laverania malariae, renamed P. falciparum) and quartan (Haemamoeba malariae, renamed P. malariae) malaria resolved the confusion of the time. In addition, his monograph also presented the first conclusive depiction that the bite of only female Anopheles mosquitoes could transmit malaria. In a classic experiment, he dispatched 112 volunteers to the Capaccio plains, a malaria-endemic area, protected them from mosquito bites between dusk and dawn, and they did not get malaria (except five of them) compared with 415 unprotected volunteers who all contracted malaria. In 1898 he and Bignami were able to produce the final proof of mosquito transmission of malaria when they fed local mosquitoes (A. claviger) on infected patients and found that uninfected individuals developed malaria through the mosquito bite.

Controversy

The 1902 Nobel Prize 

The 1902 Nobel Prize in Physiology or Medicine was awarded to Ronald Ross for his discovery of the life cycle of malarial parasite (or as the Nobel citation goes: for his work on malaria, by which he has shown how it enters the organism...). However, this was disputed and continues to be disputed to this day. Grassi was the first to suggest that there must be some developmental stage of Plasmodium in the white blood cells. In 1897, he and his associates established the developmental stages of malaria parasites in anopheline mosquitoes; and they described the complete life cycles of P. falciparum, P. vivax and P. malariae the following year. When the Nobel nomination was called, there began a fiery polemic over priority between him and Ross. The situation was worsened with the involvement of Robert Koch. The initial opinion of the Nobel Committee was that the prize should be shared between Ross and Grassi. Then Ross made a defamatory campaign accusing Grassi of deliberate fraud. Koch was appointed as a "neutral arbitrator" in the committee, and as reported, "[He] threw the full weight of his considerable authority in insisting that Grassi did not deserve the honor" (Grassi would later point out flaws in Koch's own methodology on malarial research). Ross was the first to show that malarial parasite was transmitted by the bite of infected mosquitoes, in his case the avian Plasmodium relictum. But Grassi's work revealed that human malarial parasites were carried only by female Anopheles. He identified the mosquito species correctly, in his case P. claviger. By today's standard, they are likely to have shared the Nobel prize.

Grassi's law 

Grassi had developed a dogma that "there is no malaria without Anopheles" or simply, "anophelism without malaria". This was dubbed "Grassi's Law", which is formulated as: infected man + anopheles mosquitoes = malaria. Although the equation is straightforwardly correct, the reverse implication is not so. In many areas, he himself had noted that where anopheline vectors were abundant, malaria was not at all prevalent, and sometimes absent. This caused a little problem in understanding malaria epidemiology for some time. In fact, in 1919 he identified three typical malaria-prevalent localities which were not affected by malaria in the same way: the gardens of Schito near Naples, Massarosa in Tuscany, and Alberone in Lombardia. In 1921, after repeated assessment, he concluded with the assumption of the existence of races of Anopheles that there were morphologically indistinguishable mosquitoes that do not bite humans and therefore did not play a role as vectors.
The enigma was solved in 1925, a year after his death, by his pupil Falleroni, who demonstrated that there are six cryptic species, of which only four bite humans and transmit malaria.

Recognition 

Grassi was awarded the Royal Society's Darwin Medal in 1896 for his contribution to the study of termites.

He was made a senator in Italy by King Victor Emmanuel III.

A stamp commemorating Grassi with his portrait on it was issued by the Italian post office in 1955.

His birthplace in Rovellasca has been turned into a social centre for the elderly, the front wall of which bears his bust, underneath  which there is an inscription:
IN QUESTA CASA DEI SUOI AVI 
 NACQUE IL 27 MARZO 1854 
 BATTISTA GRASSI 
 MEDICO E MAESTRO SCIENZIATO E FILOSOFO 
 CONTESE ALLA BIOLOGIA I SUOI SEGRETI 
 NE TRASSE ARMI CONTRO LA FEBBRE PALUSTRE 
 INVANO COMBATTUTA DA SECOLI 
 MORTO A ROMA IL 4 MAGGIO 1925 
 VOLLE ESSERE SEPOLTO A FIUMICINO 
 FRA GLI UMILI LAVORATORI 
 DELLA MAREMMA E DELLA PALUDE 
 DI CUI AVEVA INIZIATO LA REDENZIONE 
 I SUOI CONCITTADINI DEDICANO 
 LAPIDE RINNOVATA E ONORATA 
 NEL I° CENTENARIO DELLA NASCITA 
 MENTRE NEL MONDO SI AVVERA 
 IL SUO SOGNO D'UMANA REDENZIONE 
 DAL SECOLARE FLAGELLO MALARICO 
 27 MARZO 1954
[Translated as: IN THIS HOME OF HIS ANCESTORS/27 MARCH 1854 WAS BORN/BATTISTA GRASSI/PHYSICIAN AND EXCELLENT SCIENTIST AND PHILOSOPHER/ CONTENTIONS TO BIOLOGY /HE TOOK ARMS AGAINST MARSH FEVER/UNSUCCESSFULLY FOUGHT FOR CENTURIES/DIED IN ROME ON 4 MAY 1925/WANTED TO BE BURIED AT FIUMICINO/BETWEEN THE HUMBLE WORKERS OF MAREMMA AND MARSH/OF WHICH HE HAD STARTED THE REDEMPTION/HIS TOWNSMEN DEDICATE/TOMBSTONE AND HONOURED/IN THE CENTENARY OF HIS BIRTH /WHEN THE WORLD COMES TRUE/HIS HUMAN DREAM OF REDEMPTION/FROM THE AGE-OLD SCOURGE OF MALARIA/27 MARCH 1954]

Bibliography (partial list) 

Grassi authored more than 250 scientific papers and, in collaboration with his students and colleagues, wrote another 100. 
 1898. Rapporti tra la malaria e peculiari insetti (zanzaroni e zanzare palustri). R. C. Accad. Lincei 7:163–177.
 1899. Ancora sulla malaria. R. C. Accad. Lincei 8:559–561.
 with Bignami, A. and Bastianelli, G.. 1899. Resoconto degli studi fatti sulla malaria durante il mese di gennaio. R. C. Accad. Lincei. 8:100–104.
 1901. Studii di uno Zoologo sulla Malaria.Atti dei.Linncei.Mem. Cl.sc.fis.ecc.3(5), No. 91:299–516.6 plates in colour.

References

Further reading 
 Conci, C. & Poggi, R. 1996 Iconography of Italian Entomologists, with essential biographical data. Mem. Soc. Ent. Ital. 75 159–382, 418 Fig.
 Howard, L. O. 1930 History of applied Entomology (Somewhat Anecdotal). Smiths. Miscell. Coll. 84 X+1-564, 51 plates

External links 

 Biography of Grassi in English.
 Biography of Grassi In Italian, English translation sometimes available.
 Grassi versus Ross
 Contributions to Science
 Some places and memories related to Giovanni Battista Grassi

1854 births
1925 deaths
People from the Province of Como
Italian zoologists
Italian entomologists
Members of the Senate of the Kingdom of Italy
Malariologists
Italian tropical physicians